Santa Fe, officially the Municipality of Santa Fe, is a 4th class municipality in the province of Nueva Vizcaya, Philippines. According to the 2020 census, it has a population of 18,276 people.

It is the only town that borders Pangasinan and is a typical bus stop for commuters going to the provinces of Isabela and Cagayan. This town is the end point of the Dalton Pass, a zig zag road from San Jose and Carranglan, Nueva Ecija.

History
The Municipal district of Imugan (now Santa Fe) was an Igorot settlement during the Spanish era. It was one of the settlements discovered during the mission of Ituy, which later became part if the jurisdiction of the Commandencia of Kayapa. It became part of Aritao before it finally stood independently as a small rich town.

Its original inhabitants were the Kalanguya, cultural minority belonging to the Igorot tribe then later on followed by the Pangasinenses and the Tagalogs. Owing to the industriousness and the perseverance of the immigrants, the places gradually turn to be the progressive and the productive municipal district. With the advancement of time the immigrants themselves derived the same Santa Fe in honor of the Patron Saint San Jose-Santa Fe.

The Municipal district of Imugan was founded by Governor General Francis Burton Harrison in 1917. On 9 November 1950, Executive Order No. 368, signed by President Elpidio Quirino, abolished the municipal district structure in government and attached Imugan to Aritao and Kayapa.  Republic Act. No. 2179 was enacted on May 6, 1959, recreating the Municipal district of Imugan and changing its name to Santa Fe. By virtue of Executive Order No., 77 dated July 1, 1964 it was converted from a municipal district to a regular municipality by President Ferdinand E. Marcos, after learning of the town's annual average income of P58,510.40 during the four (4) consecutive fiscal years which ended on June 30, 1964, by virtue of Republic Act No. 1515.

Geography

Barangays
Santa Fe is politically subdivided into 15 barangays. These barangays are headed by elected officials: Barangay Captain, Barangay Council, whose members are called Barangay Councilors. All are elected every three years.

Santa Fe currently has a boundary dispute with San Nicolas, Pangasinan, in which Santa Fe claims the territory of barangay Malico. The Nueva Ecija provincial board passed a resolution on September 21, 2022, urging San Nicolas officials to respect a memorandum of agreement between the National Mapping and Resource Information Authority (NAMRIA), Pangasinan, and Nueva Vizcaya about twenty years ago. On the same day, the Nueva Vizcaya provincial board held a special session in Barangay Malico and issued a resolution requesting San Nicolas officials to refrain from building infrastructure projects within the barangay's boundaries. Said resolution also instructed San Nicolas officials to "respect the boundary" of Santa Fe as well as "the rights of the Kalanguya tribe and their ancestral domain rights." Both municipalities in both provinces claim to have a barangay named Malico.

Climate

Demographics

Economy 

Local products include brooms, strawberry jam, strawberry wine, peanut butter, orchids and quilts.

Government
Santa Fe, belonging to the lone congressional district of the province of Nueva Vizcaya, is governed by a mayor designated as its local chief executive and by a municipal council as its legislative body in accordance with the Local Government Code. The mayor, vice mayor, and the councilors are elected directly by the people through an election which is being held every three years.

Elected officials

Education
The Schools Division of Nueva Vizcaya governs the town's public education system. The division office is a field office of the DepEd in Cagayan Valley region. The office governs the public and private elementary and public and private high schools throughout the municipality.

Gallery

References

External links

 
 [ Philippine Standard Geographic Code]
Philippine Census Information
Local Governance Performance Management System

Municipalities of Nueva Vizcaya